Marc Stuart Krauss (born October 5, 1987) is an American former professional baseball first baseman and outfielder. He has played in MLB for the Houston Astros, Los Angeles Angels of Anaheim, Tampa Bay Rays, and Detroit Tigers.

Krauss played college baseball at Ohio University, where he was named an All-American. He was drafted by the Arizona Diamondbacks in 2009, and was later traded to the Houston Astros in 2012. Krauss made his major league debut with the Astros in 2013.

Early life
Krauss attended Patrick Henry High School in Hamler, Ohio, where he played baseball, American football, and basketball. A wide receiver for the school's football team, he was named All-Ohio three times. He was also named All-Ohio as a catcher for the baseball team.

Despite receiving scholarship offers to play football for the University of Toledo and Bowling Green State University, Krauss decided to pursue baseball. Krauss attended Ohio University, where he played college baseball for the Ohio Bobcats baseball team. In 2007, Krauss was named Mid-American Conference (MAC) Freshman of the Year. In 2008, he played collegiate summer baseball in the Cape Cod Baseball League for the Harwich Mariners and Bourne Braves, and was named a league all-star. In 2009, he was named an All-American and MAC Player of the Year. He set Bobcat records for home runs and slugging percentage.

Professional career
The Arizona Diamondbacks drafted Krauss in the second round of the 2009 Major League Baseball Draft. In his professional debut, Krauss batted .304 in 32 games for the South Bend Silver Hawks of the Class A Midwest League, before his season ended due to an ankle injury. The Diamondbacks assigned him to the Visalia Rawhide of the Class A-Advanced California League in 2010.

In July 2012, the Diamondbacks traded Krauss and Bobby Borchering to the Houston Astros for Chris Johnson. The Astros assigned Krauss to the Corpus Christi Hooks of the Class AA Texas League. In August, the Astros promoted Krauss to the Oklahoma City RedHawks of the Class AAA Pacific Coast League (PCL).

The Astros promoted Krauss to the major leagues on June 21, 2013.  Krauss had his first RBIs on a bases-loaded single in a 9–5 victory over the Texas Rangers, on July 6, 2013.  Krauss hit his first home run on July 7, 2013 against Justin Grimm, in a 5–4 loss. Krauss played 52 games that season, finishing the year with a .209 batting average, 4 home runs and 13 runs batted in (RBI).

After the 2014 season, the Los Angeles Angels of Anaheim claimed Krauss off of waivers. They designated him for assignment on January 8, 2015. He stayed with the Angels for the beginning of the 2015 season but was sent outright to the Salt Lake Bees of the PCL.

On June 25, 2015, the Angels traded Krauss to the Tampa Bay Rays for pitching prospect Kyle Winkler. He was designated for assignment by the Rays on July 4. On July 6, 2015, Krauss was claimed off of waivers by the Detroit Tigers and started the next day. He homered in his first at-bat for the Tigers, exactly two years to the day after his first Major League home run. On August 22, 2015, Krauss was released by the Tigers.

On December 14, 2015, Krauss signed a minor league deal with the New York Mets.

On April 6, 2017, Krauss signed with the Long Island Ducks of the Atlantic League of Professional Baseball.

Personal life
Krauss is married to Kelcey Krauss. They had a daughter born in 2013, and another born in 2015.

See also

2009 College Baseball All-America Team

References

External links

1987 births
Living people
Baseball players from Ohio
Major League Baseball outfielders
Houston Astros players
Los Angeles Angels players
Tampa Bay Rays players
Detroit Tigers players
Ohio Bobcats baseball players
Bourne Braves players
Harwich Mariners players
South Bend Silver Hawks players
Toledo Mud Hens players
Visalia Rawhide players
Scottsdale Scorpions players
Mobile BayBears players
Corpus Christi Hooks players
Oklahoma City RedHawks players
Salt Lake Bees players
Las Vegas 51s players
Long Island Ducks players
People from Deshler, Ohio